A certified copy is a copy (often a photocopy) of a primary document that has on it an endorsement or certificate that it is a true copy of the primary document. It does not certify that the primary document is genuine, only that it is a true copy of the primary document.

A certified copy is often used in English-speaking common law countries as a convenient way of providing a copy of documents. It is usually inexpensive to obtain. A certified copy may be required for official government or court purposes and for commercial purposes. It avoids the owner of important documents (especially identity documents) giving up possession of those documents which might mean a risk of their loss or damage.

It has some similarities to a notarized copy, which is a form used in some countries, and particularly in some US states. A notarized copy is signed by a notary public (not to be confused with a notary in a civil law country).

The certified copy is signed by a person nominated by the person or agency asking for it. Typically, the person is referred to as an authorised person.  The person who is authorised to sign the certificate will vary between countries. Sometimes a person is authorised by legislation to do so (for example a court clerk, solicitor, or notary public), but this is not always so. In some countries, for example the United Kingdom and South Africa, identity documents can also be certified by authorised post office staff.

A copy of a primary document that is to be used internationally may have to be in the form of a notarized copy rather than a certified copy. A notarized copy may be more expensive to obtain. A copy of a document to be used internationally may also have to comply with special rules - Hague Convention Abolishing the Requirement of Legalisation for Foreign Public Documents.

If the primary document needs to be translated, an additional certificate is usually required. Typically, the document must be translated professionally and have the professional's certificate of accuracy attached to the translation together with a copy of the primary document. Then, the primary document, the translation, and the certificate of accuracy are photocopied in the form of a certified copy. For example, a Russian birth certificate used in an English-speaking country, a notarized copy will be required.

Australia
In Australia, certified copies are solely the creation of administrative practice. There is no specific legislation at federal, state, or territorial level.

Certified copies have long been used to give a veneer of authenticity to a photocopy of a primary document. In practice, they are very easy to obtain at almost no cost other than the photocopy, and are used in a wide range of situations, especially with identity documents.

In practice, and purely for convenience, a copy may usually be certified by a person who is able to witness a statutory declaration under federal legislation about Statutory Declarations. Categories of people are listed in Schedule 2 of the Statutory Declarations Regulations 1993 (Cth).
Schedule 2 states that chiropractors, dentists, legal practitioners, medical practitioners, nurses, optometrists, patent attorneys, pharmacists, physiotherapists, psychologists, trade mark attorneys and Veterinary surgeons may certify copies. Part 2 of the schedule lists various other professions and positions, the members or occupants of which may also certify copies (for example, judges, police officers and members of parliament).

A typical certificate endorsed on the photocopy, often typed or stamped except for the signature:
CERTIFIED TRUE COPY OF THE ORIGINAL

I certify that this is a true copy of the original document.

Signed:
Dated:
Authority to sign:
Telephone number:

Certified copies can be quite basic in Australia due to the lack of legislation.  More detail is often required by the person or agency requiring it.  Sometimes the person or agency will contact the person certifying the copy to limit the possibility of a fraudulent copy.

In some states and territories, police stations and libraries have arrangements to enable documents to be certified or witnessed by a justice of the peace.  This service is free.

Botswana
Photocopies can be certified free at a police station. Certified copies, for example of the "Omang" state identity card, are widely used, and are often required for job applications, etc.

India
In India, under section 2(j)(ii) of The Right to Information Act, 2005, the Public Information Officer (PIO) is mandatorily 'required to provide the appellant "Certified copies of documents or records."' In such a case, the PIO is only certifying that copies of documents or records are true copies of those held on a 'X' page of a 'X' file of the Public Authority, irrespective of their original source.

Sri Lanka
In Sri Lanka, certified copy or true copy of an original document can be attested by an attorney, a notary public or a justice of the peace.

United States
Certified copies of public records, such as birth and marriage certificates, must be obtained from the office that holds the record.

In most U.S. states and territories, notaries public are authorized to certify copies of any documents that are not public records. For example, they may certify copies of passports, identification cards, driver licenses, statements and contracts. In this case, the notary signs a statement directly certifying that the copy is true. In other states, notaries are not authorized to certify copies, or may certify copies of only a few types of documents such as their own notary journals. In case the notary is not authorized to certify a copy, it is possible to perform an alternative procedure, known as "copy certification by document custodian", where the holder of the document signs a statement affirming that the copy is true, and the notary only certifies that the holder signed and affirmed this statement.

To certify that the copy is true, some states require that the notary personally make or supervise the photocopying process, while others allow the notary to visually compare a copy presented by the requester to the original document.

Example of copy certification by notary:

I certify that this is a true and correct copy of a record in the possession of ___.
Dated ___

___           (Notarial stamp, including name,
(Notary Public)                           title, and commission expiration) 

Example of copy certification by document custodian:
I, ___, hereby declare that the attached reproduction of ___ is a true and correct copy of the original document.

___
(Document custodian)

Signed and sworn to (or affirmed) before me on ___ by ___.

___           (Notarial stamp, including name,
(Notary Public)                           title, and commission expiration)

Vietnam
In Vietnam, a certified copy or true copy of an original document can be attested by a Ward/District or higher People's Committee or Notary Office, not only Vietnamese official documents but also foreign documents.

See also
Exemplified copy

References

Legal documents
Public records
Notary